The Franconian Forest, is a mid-altitude mountain range in Northern Bavaria, Germany. It is located in the district of Upper Franconia (Oberfranken) and forms the geological connection between the Fichtelgebirge and the Thuringian Forest. Along the centre lies the watershed between the basins of the Main and the Saale, belonging to the systems of the Rhine and Elbe respectively.

References

External links 
 The Franconian Forest, described by a native Frank (in English)

 
Forests and woodlands of Bavaria
Mountain ranges of Bavaria
Mountain ranges of Thuringia
Forests and woodlands of Thuringia